SuperBrawl VI was the sixth SuperBrawl professional wrestling pay-per-view (PPV) event produced by World Championship Wrestling (WCW). The event took place on February 11, 1996, from the Bayfront Arena in St. Petersburg, Florida.

The main event was a steel cage match between Hulk Hogan and The Giant. Hogan defeated Giant to win the match. This event marked Brian Pillman's final match in WCW; in his "I Respect You" Strap Match against The Taskmaster, Pillman shouted "I respect you, bookerman!", breaking kayfabe, before leaving the ring.

Storylines
The event featured wrestlers from pre-existing scripted feuds and storylines. Wrestlers portrayed villains, heroes, or less distinguishable characters in the scripted events that built tension and culminated in a wrestling match or series of matches.

Event

All the pre-PPV matches took place live on WCW Main Event. As per the pre-match stipulations, Johnny B. Badd's victory resulted in him winning Diamond Dallas Page's remaining lottery money of $6.6 million for the Diamond Doll, as well as retaining her services as a valet.

In the WCW World Heavyweight Championship match, Ric Flair pinned Randy Savage after Miss Elizabeth turned on Savage by allowing Flair to hit him with one of her high heel shoes.

Results

References

External links
SuperBrawl VI

SuperBrawl 6
Events in St. Petersburg, Florida
1996 in Florida
Professional wrestling in St. Petersburg, Florida
1996 World Championship Wrestling pay-per-view events
February 1996 events in the United States